Stephan Leyhe (born 5 January 1992) is a German ski jumper.

He made his World Cup debut in December 2014 in Engelberg and has one individual win to date, as well as a third-place overall finish at the 2018–19 Four Hills Tournament.

Record

Olympic Games

FIS World Nordic Ski Championships

World Cup

Season standings

Individual wins

Individual starts

Podiums

References

External links

1992 births
Living people
German male ski jumpers
Olympic ski jumpers of Germany
Ski jumpers at the 2018 Winter Olympics
Ski jumpers at the 2022 Winter Olympics
Medalists at the 2018 Winter Olympics
Medalists at the 2022 Winter Olympics
Olympic silver medalists for Germany
Olympic bronze medalists for Germany
Olympic medalists in ski jumping
FIS Nordic World Ski Championships medalists in ski jumping
People from Waldeck-Frankenberg
Sportspeople from Kassel (region)